The 1957 Boston University Terriers football team was an American football team that represented Boston University as an independent during the 1957 college football season. In its first season under head coach Steve Sinko, the team compiled a 5–3 record and outscored opponents by a total of 196 to 141.

Schedule

References

Boston University
Boston University Terriers football seasons
Boston University Terriers football